The Environment and Communications Committee is a standing committee of the Icelandic parliament.

Jurisdiction
According to law № 55/1991, with later amendments, all matters relating to the following subjects are referred to the Environment and Communications Committee:

Planning
Construction
Research
Consulting
Protection
Sustainability
Transport
Implementation

Members, 140th parliament
The main members have seats in the committees and attend the meetings. When they are unable to do so the substitute members temporarily take their place.

Main

Substitute

See also
List of standing committees of the Icelandic parliament

External links
 
 

Standing committees of the Icelandic parliament